Turtle Mountain, or the Turtle Mountains, is an area in central North America, in the north-central portion of the U.S. state of North Dakota and southwestern portion of the Canadian province of Manitoba, approximately  south of the city of Brandon on provincial highway 10. It is a plateau 2,000 ft (600 m) above sea level, 300 ft to 400 ft (90 m to 120 m) above the surrounding countryside, extending 20 mi (32 km) from north to south and 40 mi (64 km) from east to west. Rising , North Dakota's most prominent peak, Boundary Butte, is located at the western edge of the plateau.

It has timber, numerous lakes, and small deposits of low-grade manganese.  One of the largest lakes in the Turtle Mountains is Lake Metigoshe, which straddles the international border, with about one-eighth of the lake in Canada.  The region is home to Turtle Mountain Provincial Park, a state park, two historic sites, and various hunting and fishing opportunities.

Turtle Mountain is the traditional territory of the Plains Ojibwe, as well as part of the Métis homeland. Rapid colonization and settlement in the 19th century, along with the establishment of a firm border between Canada and the United States, displaced many Indigenous peoples to and from the region. Some identify as the Turtle Mountain Chippewa, who are federally recognized and whose reservation is in the valley on the southeastern edge of the plateau.

History
The Plains Ojibwe have a long established history in the Turtle Mountain region and the surrounding area. East of Turtle mountain at Pembina lived one Ojibwe group, as well as a number of Métis families. The Métis hunted and fished in the Turtle Mountains and increasingly moved westward from Pembina in search of declining buffalo populations. When the federal government agreed that Pembina would be a part of the United States in 1818, the Métis living there, along with a number of Chippewa with kinship ties to the Métis, and some Ojibwe claimed land near Turtle Mountain. The federal government recognized and designated this group the Pembina Band, but this did not include all the Ojibwe peoples already established at Turtle Mountain. The misidentification of all Ojibwe as part of the Pembina Band has prevented their full assertion of rights. Throughout the 19th century, the Pembina band was broken up and dispossessed of their lands as the government opened up the area for settlement. Among these groups are the Turtle Mountain Chippewa, and the Little Shell Tribe of Chippewa.

Environment

Wildlife 
The Turtle Mountain area is covered by deciduous forest. Woodland overstory species are primarily green ash (Fraxinus pennsylvanica), quaking aspen (Populus tremuloides), Manitoba maple (Acer negundo), American elm (Ulmus americana), paper birch (Betula papyrifera), bur oak (Quercus macrocarpa), and balsam poplar (Populus balsamifera). Common shrubs in the forest understory include beaked hazel (Corylus cornuta), chokecherry (Prunus virginiana), saskatoon berry (Amelanchier alnifolia), nannyberry (Viburnum lentago), dogwood (Cornus sericea), highbush cranberry (Viburnum trilobum) and pincherry (Prunus pensylvanica). The area near Mary Lake includes the spotted coralroot orchid (Corallorhiza maculata) and calypso orchid (Calypso bulbosa). Turtle Mountain is home to moose (Alces alces), white-tailed deer (Odocoileus virginianus), beaver (Castor canadensis), raccoon (Procyon lotor) and mink (Neogale vison), as well as birds like loons (Gavia sp.), great blue heron (Ardea herodias herodias), black-crowned night heron (Nycticorax nycticorax), the double-crested cormorant (Nannopterum auritum) and red-necked grebes (Podiceps grisegena). The abundant small lakes support painted turtles (Chrysemys picta), wood frogs (Lithobates sylvaticus), northern leopard frogs (Lithobates pipiens), and the barred tiger salamander (Ambystoma mavortium).

Coal mining 
Following the discovery of coal in 1879 there was coal mining in the Turtle Mountains near Old Deloraine town site in Manitoba and along ravines on the western flank of Turtle Mountain. The Lennox mine opened in 1883 and mining continued intermittently at the Voden, McArthur, McKay, and Manitoba Coal Company mines until 1908. When higher quality coal was found elsewhere and the Trans-Canada Railway was built, the mines closed. Small scale coal mining was revived during the Depression because Turtle Mountain lignite was cheaper than higher coal grades from Saskatchewan. Peak annual production of the McArthur, Henderson, Deep Ravine, Salter, Powne, and Deloraine Coal Company mines averaged over 1000 tons each. However, the Salter and Henderson mines produced 95% of Manitoba's coal over a span of about eight years. The last mine closed in 1943 due to labour shortages during World War II and changed economic conditions.  The old Deloraine town site is now covered by a man-made lake, made when the Turtle-Head Dam was built.

Climate 
Climate Station in Southern Manitoba, Canada.

Communities in the area
 Belcourt, North Dakota
 Boissevain, Manitoba
 Bottineau, North Dakota
 Deloraine, Manitoba
 Dunseith, North Dakota
 East Dunseith, North Dakota
 Green Acres, North Dakota
 Rolla, North Dakota
 St. John, North Dakota
 Shell Valley, North Dakota

Counties and rural municipalities
 Bottineau County, North Dakota
 Rolette County, North Dakota
 Rural Municipality of Morton, Manitoba
 Rural Municipality of Turtle Mountain, Manitoba
 Rural Municipality of Winchester, Manitoba

Parks
 International Peace Garden
 Lake Metigoshe State Park
 Rabb Lake National Wildlife Refuge
 School Section Lake National Wildlife Refuge
 Turtle Mountain Provincial Park
 William Lake Provincial Park
 Willow Lake National Wildlife Refuge

Notable sites
 International Peace Garden 

References

External links
Bottineau Winter Park
Turtle Mountain Provincial Park
Turtle Mountains at Dakota Search

Landforms of Bottineau County, North Dakota
Landforms of Rolette County, North Dakota
Regions of North Dakota
Landforms of Manitoba
Forests of North Dakota